Euthalia franciae, the French duke, is a species of nymphalid butterfly found in the Indomalayan realm.

Subspecies
Euthalia franciae franciae (Nepal, Sikkim, Bhutan)
Euthalia franciae attenuata (Tytler) (Upper Burma)
Euthalia franciae raja (C. & R. Felder, 1859) (Assam, Yunnan)

References

F
Butterflies of Asia
Butterflies of Indochina
Butterflies described in 1846
Taxa named by George Robert Gray